Helcystogramma rufescens is a moth of the family Gelechiidae. It is found in most of Europe.

The wingspan is 14–17 mm. Forewings with termen straight; light reddish-ochreous, sometimes darker between veins posteriorly ; second, discal stigma sometimes fuscous. Hindwings are whitish-grey, tinged with reddish-ochreous. The larva is white ; subdorsal line and lateral series of oblique marks dark grey; dots black; 3-6 black, 3 and 4 white-edged anteriorly, 6 with brown dorsal blotch ; head and plate of 2 black .

Adults are on wing from June to August.

The larvae feed on various grasses, including Brachypodium sylvaticum, Arrhenatherum elatius, Poa trivialis, Dactylis glomerata, Phalaris arundinacea, Melica nutans, Calamagrostis arundinacea and Calamagrostis epigejos. They spin grass blades and feed inside the spiral spinning, causing whitening of the grass blade tip. They change leaves several times. Larvae can be found from April to July. They are black and white striped.

References

Moths described in 1828
rufescens
Moths of Europe